Bonnievale may refer to:
 Bonnievale, Western Cape, a village in South Africa
 Bonnie Vale, Western Australia, an abandoned townsite in Australia